Flight 612 may refer to:

Pulkovo Aviation Enterprise Flight 612, crashed on the 22nd of August, 2006.
Air West Flight 612, hijacked on  January 24, 2007

0612